Chacras de Paysandú, which means "Ranches of Paysandú", is a wide but sparsely populated rural area, which is an east and southeast extension of the city of Paysandú in the Paysandú Department of western Uruguay.

Within Chacras de Paysandú are two villages, which form enclaves. These are Esperanza to the east and Porvenir to the southeast.

Population
In 2011 it had a population of 3,965.
 
Source: Instituto Nacional de Estadística de Uruguay

References

External links
INE map of Chacras de Paysandú

Populated places in the Paysandú Department